Berlin Recycling Volleys is a professional men's volleyball club founded in 1991 and based in Berlin, Germany. They compete in the German Bundesliga and the CEV Champions League.

Honours

Domestic
 Volleyball Bundesliga
Winners (12): 1992–93, 2002–03, 2003–04, 2011–12, 2012–13, 2013–14, 2015–16, 2016–17, 2017–18, 2018–19, 2020–21, 2021–22

 German Cup
Winners (6): 1993–94, 1995–96, 1999–2000, 2015–16, 2019–20, 2022–23

 German SuperCup
Winners (4): 2019–20, 2020–21, 2021–22, 2022–23

International
 CEV Champions League
Final Four (2): 2014–15, 2016–17

 CEV Cup
Winners (1): 2015–16

 CEV Challenge Cup
Bronze (2): 1998–99, 2009–10

Team
As of 2022–23 season

References

External links
 Official website 
 Team profile at Volleybox.net

German volleyball clubs
Sport in Berlin
Volleyball clubs established in 1991
1991 establishments in Germany